Fazlı Teoman Yakupoğlu (born 20 November 1967) is a Turkish acoustic rock singer and songwriter. His biggest hits include Paramparça, Senden Önce Senden Sonra, 17 and Papatya. On Papatya, Turkish female rock singer Özlem Tekin features as backing vocals. Şebnem Ferah has also featured on a couple of Teoman's tracks.

After studying business administration and mathematics at Boğaziçi University, he transferred to and graduated from the sociology department of the same university. He completed his graduate study on women studies at Istanbul University.

His formal music career was first started in his first band Mirage in 1986. Teoman staged with various bands for 10 years until his breakthrough song, "Ne Ekmek Ne de Su" (Neither Bread Nor Water) (music by Barlas Erinç- lyrics by Barlas Erinç and Teoman)  which won the first prize in Roxy Müzik Günleri (Roxy Music Days). On August 4, 2011, he announced on his official website that he decided to quit music, indefinitely. Nevertheless, on November 24, 2012 Teoman officially announced his return to music. The same year he collaborated with Sebnem Ferah. In 2015 he released a new album "Eski Bir Ruya Ugruna" to great success. Teoman released official music video for "Limanında" in 2016, from his album named "Eski Bir Rüya Uğruna". In this music video, Teoman leans on Syrian dram through couple named Beriwan and Wassim, and their escape to Berlin, via Turkey.

Discography
Studio albums
 Teoman (1996)
 O (1998) (She)
 Onyedi (2000) (Seventeen)
 Gönülçelen (2001) (Heart Stealer)
 Teoman (2003)
 En Güzel Hikayem (2004) (My Most Beautiful Story)
 Renkli Rüyalar Oteli (2006) (Hotel of the Colorful Dreams)
 İnsanlık Halleri (2009) (The States of Humanity)
 Aşk ve Gurur (2011) (Love and Pride)
 Eski Bir Rüya Uğruna... (2015) (For the Sake of an Old Dream)
 Gecenin Sonuna Yolculuk (2021) (Journey to the End of Night)

Compilation albums
 Best of Teoman (2004)
 Söz Müzik Teoman (2007) (Music and Lyrics by Teoman)
 Yavaş Yavaş (2014)
 Koyu Antoloji (2018)
 Teoman ve Piyano (2021)

Remixes
 Remixler (2001)
 İstanbul'da Sonbahar Remixler (2001)
 Remixler 1 (2001)
 Duş Remixler (2001)
 Ruhun Sarışın (2011) (Your Soul Is Blonde)
 Aşk ve Gurur Remixler (2001)

Filmography
 Elephants and Grass (Filler ve Çimen) (2000)
 Bank (2002)
 Mumya Firarda (Runaway Mummy) (2002)
 Balans ve Manevra (Balance and Maneuver) (2005) (actor, director, writer, composer and producer)
 Romantik (Romantic) (2007) (actor, composer)
 At the Bar (Barda) (2007)

References

External links

 
 

1967 births
Living people
People from Giresun
Turkish male film actors
Turkish male singers
Turkish pop singers
Turkish rock singers
Singers from Istanbul